The 32nd European Film Awards were presented in Berlin, Germany on 7 December 2019.

Selection

Feature
The list of feature-length fiction films recommended for a nomination for the 2019 European Film Awards.

 I Do Not Care If We Go Down in History as Barbarians  - director: Radu Jude (Romania/Czech Republic/France/Bulgaria/Germany)
 A Tale of Three Sisters  - director: Emin Alper (Turkey/Germany/Netherlands/Greece)
 A Twelve-Year Night  - director: Álvaro Brechner (Uruguay/Spain/Argentina/France/Germany)
 A White, White Day  - director: Hlynur Pálmason (Iceland/Denmark/Sweden)
 An Officer and a Spy - director: Roman Polanski (France)
 All Good  - director: Eva Trobisch (Germany)
 And Then We Danced  - director: Levan Akin (Sweden/Georgia/France)
 Bad Poems  - director: Gábor Reisz (Hungary/France)
 Beanpole  - director: Kantemir Balagov (Russia)
 By the Grace of God  - director: François Ozon (France/Belgium)
 Chained  - director: Yaron Shani (Israel/Germany)
 Clergy  - director: Wojciech Smarzowski (Poland)
 Dafne  - director: Federico Bondi (Italy)
 Dirty God  - director: Sacha Polak (Netherlands/United Kingdom/Belgium/Ireland)
 The Favourite  - director: Yorgos Lanthimos (Ireland/United Kingdom/United States)
 Fire Will Come  - director: Oliver Laxe (Spain/France/Luxembourg)
 God Exists, Her Name Is Petrunya  - director: Teona Strugar Mitevska (North Macedonia/Belgium/Slovenia/Croatia/France)
 Gundermann  - director: Andreas Dresen (Germany)
 High Life  - director: Claire Denis (France/Germany/United Kingdom/Poland/USA)
 Homeward  - director: Nariman Aliev (Ukraine)
 I Was at Home, but...  - director: Angela Schanelec (Germany/Serbia)
 It Must Be Heaven  - director: Elia Suleiman (France/Germany/Canada/Turkey/Qatar)
 Joy  - director: Sudabeh Mortezai (Austria)
 Jumpman  - director: Ivan I. Tverdovskiy (Russia/Lithuania/Ireland/France)

 Les Misérables  - director: Ladj Ly (France)
 Little Joe  - director: Jessica Hausner (Austria/United Kingdom/Germany)
 Mr. Jones  - director: Agnieszka Holland (Poland/United Kingdom/Ukraine)
 Non Fiction  - director: Olivier Assayas (France)
 Oleg  - director: Juris Kursietis (Latvia/Belgium/Lithuania/France)
 Pain and Glory  - director: Pedro Almodóvar (Spain)
 Piranhas  - director: Claudio Giovannesi (Italy)
 Portrait of a Lady on Fire  - director: Céline Sciamma (France)
 Queen of Hearts  - director: May el-Touhky (Denmark/Sweden)
 The Realm  - director: Rodrigo Sorogoyen (Spain/France)
 Sibel  - director: Guillaume Giovanetti, Çagla Zencirci (Turkey/France/Germany/Luxembourg)
 Sons of Denmark  - director: Ulaa Salim (Denmark)
 Sorry We Missed You  - director: Ken Loach (United Kingdom/France/Belgium)
 Stitches  - director: Miroslav Terzić (Serbia/Slovenia/Croatia/Bosnia and Herzegovina)
 Synonyms - director: Nadav Lapid (France/Israel/Germany)
 System Crasher  - director: Nora Fingscheidt (Germany)
 Tel Aviv on Fire  - director: Sameh Zoabi (Luxembourg/Belgium/Israel/France)
 The Traitor  - director: Marco Bellocchio (Italy/France/Germany/Brazil)
 Twin Flower  - director: Laura Luchetti (Italy)
 Werewolf  - director: Adrian Panek (Poland/Netherlands/Germany)
 The Whistlers  - director: Corneliu Porumboiu (Romania/France/Germany)
 Yesterday - director: Danny Boyle (United Kingdom)
 Young Ahmed  - director: Jean-Pierre Dardenne, Luc Dardenne (Belgium/France)

Documentary
Ten documentary festivals have suggested one film each, which has had its world premiere at the respective festival's latest edition, to the committee. Chosen in co-operation with the European Documentary Network (EDN), these festivals are: Cinéma du Réel (France), CPH:DOX (Denmark), Doclisboa (Portugal), DOK Leipzig (Germany), IDFA (Netherlands), Ji.hlava (Czech Republic), Krakow Film Festival (Poland), Sheffield Doc/Fest (UK), Thessaloniki Documentary Film Festival (Greece) and Visions du Réel (Switzerland). Based on their recommendations and the films individually submitted, the documentary committee, decided on the EFA Documentary Selection. 

 Advocate - director: Rachel Leah Jones, Philippe Bellaiche (Israel, Canada, Switzerland)
 Aquarela - director: Victor Kossakovsky (Germany, United Kingdom, Denmark)
 Delphine and Carole - director: Callisto Mc Nulty (France, Switzerland)
 For Sama - director: Waad Al-Kateab, Edward Wat (United Kingdom, United States)
 Heimat Is A Space in Time - director: Thomas Heise (Germany, Austria)
 Honeyland - director: Ljubomir Stefanov, Tamara Kotevska (North Macedonia)

 M - director: Yolande Zauberman (France)
 Push - director: Fredrik Gertten (Sweden, Canada)
 Putin's Witnesses - director: Vitaly Mansky (Latvia, Switzerland, Czech Republic)
 Scheme Birds - director: Ellen Fiske, Ellinor Halli (Sweden, United Kingdom)
 Selfie - director: Agostino Ferrente (France, Italy)
 The Disappearance of my Mother - director: Beniamino Barrese (Italy, United States)

Short films
For the 2019 and 2020 editions of the European Film Awards, the European Film Academy will welcome new festivals to participate in the EFA Short Film selection and awarding procedure.
When the annual cycle of participating festivals – running from October of the preceding year to September of the actual awards year – is complete, a committee of short film experts and of EFA Board Members will nominate five of the short film candidates for the award European Short Film.

 November 2018:
 Internationale Kurzfilmtage Winterthur (Switzerland - from 2019 on)
 Cork Film Festival (Ireland)
 PÖFF Shorts (Estonia - from 2019 on)
 Dec. 2018:
 Leuven International Short Film Festival (Belgium)
 Jan. 2019:
 International Film Festival Rotterdam (the Netherlands)
 Feb. 2019:
 Clermont-Ferrand International Short Film Festival (France)
 Berlin International Film Festival (Germany)
 Mar. 2019:
Tampere Film Festival (Finland)
 Apr. 2019:
Go Short – International Short Film Festival Nijmegen (the Netherlands)

 May 2019:
 Krakow Film Festival (Poland)
 VIS Vienna Shorts Festival (Austria)
 Jun. 2019:
 Hamburg International Short Film Festival (Germany)
 Jul. 2019:
 Curtas Vila do Conde - International Film Festival (Portugal)
 Motovun Film Festival (Croatia)
 Aug. 2019:
 Locarno Festival (Switzerland)
 Sarajevo Film Festival (Bosnia & Herzegovina)
 Venice Film Festival (Italy)
 Odense International Film Festival (Denmark)
 Sep. 2019:
 International Short Film Festival in Drama (Greece)
 Encounters Festival (UK)

Awards voted by EFA Members 
Nomination has been announced on November 9th, 2019.

Feature

Best Film

European Comedy
The nominees were announced on 29 October 2019.
The nominations were determined by a committee composed of EFA Board Members Katriel Schory (Israel) and Angela Bosch Ríus (Spain), distributor/festival programmer Selma Mehadzic (Croatia), film, festival & event specialist Jacob Neiiendam (Denmark) and producer Nik Powell (UK).

Best Director

Best Screenwriter

Best Actress

Best Actor

Documentary

Animated Feature
The nominations were determined by a committee consisting of EFA Board Deputy Chairman Antonio Saura (Spain), EFA Board Member Graziella Bildesheim (Italy) and producer Paul Young (Ireland) as well as, representing CARTOON, the European Association of Animation Film, film critic Stéphane Dreyfus (France), producer Kristine M. I. Knudsen (Germany) and director Janno Põldma (Estonia).

Short Film

Television Series

European Achievement in Fiction Series Award

Technical awards
The Favourite has scooped four of the eight technical awards. The jury for the initial eight winners were: Nadia Ben Rachid, editor, France: Vanja Černul, cinematographer, Croatia; Annette Focks, composer, Germany; Gerda Koekoek, hair and make-up artist, Netherlands; Eimer Ní Mhaoldomhnaigh, costume designer, Ireland; Artur Pinheiro, production designer, Portugal; Gisle Tveito, sound designer, Norway; István Vajda, visual effects, Hungary.

Best Composer

Best Production Designer

Best Makeup and Hairstyling

Best Sound Designer

Best Cinematographer

Best Costume Designer

Best Editor

Best Visual Effects

Critics Award

European Discovery - Prix FIPRESCI
The nominees were announced on 8 October 2019.
The nominations were determined by a committee composed of EFA Board Members Mike Goodridge (UK) and Valérie Delpierre (Spain), festival programmer Azize Tan (Turkey) as well as film critics Marta Balaga (Finland), Robbie Eksiel (Greece) and Michael Pattison (UK) as representatives of FIPRESCI, the International Federation of Film Critics.

Audience awards

People's Choice Award
The nominees were announced on 2 September 2019.

University Award
The European Film Academy and Filmfest Hamburg, a committee consisting of producer Carlo Cresta-Dina (Italy), EFA Board Member Joanna Szymańska (producer/Poland) and university representative Dagmar Brunow (Linnaeus University, Sweden) has decided on the following nominations:

European Co-Production Award — Prix Eurimages
The award acknowledges the decisive role of coproductions in fostering international exchange, and pays tribute to a woman's contribution to the success of film coproduction.

Honorary Awards

European Achievement in World Cinema

Lifetime Achievement Award

Films with multiple nominations and awards

Broadcasters 

  Foxtel Arts 
  ORF FM4
  cinenews.be
  BHT 1
  HRT
  Total Film
  ARTos Foundation
  Helsinki IFF
  Les Arcs FF
  public.ge
  RBB online
  Cosmote TV
  RÚV
  RTÉ Player
  Cineuropa
  Rai Movie, rai.it
  Dokufest
  Riga Int'l Short FF
  LRT Plius
  Luxembourg FF
  PBS
  iffr.com
  Norway Film Institute
  TVN Fabuła, New Horizons Cinema
  Portuguese Academy Of Film / ICA
  Transilvanis IFF
  Freezone Belgrade
  Theatre Bratislava, Visegrad Film Forum
  RTVSLO
  Movistar+, Movistar CineDoc&Roll, Seville European FF, Filmin
  moviezine
  Curzon
  NTU

Call to pull Polanski's nominations 
French feminists and film industry professionals, including Rosanna Arquette, Andrea Bescond, Eric Metayer, Amandine Gay, Catherine Zavlav asked for An Officer and a Spy to be taken out of contention for the awards. The nominations were announced just days after actress Valentine Monnier came forward with her story of allegedly being raped by Polanski in 1975 in newspaper Le Parisien, which was corroborated by contemporary witnesses. The group addressed the request to EFA Production director Marion Doring and jury members Nadia Ben Rachid, Vanja Cernjul, Annette Focks, Eimer Ni Mhaoldomhnaigh, Gerda Koekoek, Artur Pinheiro, Gisle Tveito and Istvan Vadja.

References

External links 
 

2019 film awards
2019 in Berlin
2019 in Europe
European Film Awards ceremonies